The  key is a key commonly found on desktop and laptop keyboards. The key has the opposite effect of the Home key.

Its standard symbol  as described in ISO/IEC 9995-7, i.e. , is used on some full-size keyboards instead of a possibly localized text label.

Microsoft Windows
In modern Microsoft Windows text editing applications, the  key is primarily used to move the cursor to the end of the line in which it is positioned.

macOS
In most macOS applications, the key works differently than on other platforms. When the key is pressed, the window scrolls to the bottom, while the cursor position does not change at all; that is, the  key is tied to the window, not the text box being edited. On Apple keyboards that do not have an End key, one can press  for the End key functionality described above. To get the same result as the Windows platform (that is, going to the end of the current line of text), press . In most single-line text fields, you can also instead press the down arrow key. An application can be used to change this behaviour.

Linux
In Linux, the  key has basically the same functionality as it does on Windows. It positions the cursor at the end of a line in editable text, and otherwise scrolls a scrollable document to the end.

Non-GUI applications
In older screen-oriented, text-based (non-GUI) applications, the user pressed the "End" key to indicate that they had finished entering data on a particular "screen".

See also
 Home key

References

Computer keys